Sí Se Puede! (Spanish for "Yes We Can!") is a 1977 various artists charity album featuring Los Lobos and various vocalists, including the Salas Brothers of the band Tierra. Proceeds from the album went towards the United Farm Workers of America. "Sí, se puede" is the motto of the United Farm Workers of America.

Background

In 1976, Art Brambila, a television and music producer from Los Angeles, was looking for a sponsor for his new Latin music television show, The Mean Salsa Machine. He had heard that Cesar Chavez, president of the United Farm Workers, had a relationship with Coca-Cola and asked him for help to secure a deal with the company. When Chavez succeeded in getting the sponsorship for the show, Brambila wanted to repay him. Brambila decided to put together an album of songs honoring Chavez and the United Farm Workers, and chose Los Lobos, then a local Mexican folk combo called Los Lobos Del Este De Los Angeles, to be the backing band for the project. They would accompany a variety of vocalists performing songs celebrating Chavez's accomplishments and the struggle of farm workers.

Vocalists Carmen Moreno from Fresno, Geri Gonzales of East L.A., the Salas brothers of Lincoln Heights, Ramon "Tiguere" Rodriguez from Phoenix, Brambila's brother Raul, and a Los Angeles school choir agreed to participate. Herb Alpert, President of A&M Records, donated studio time and, in January 1977, Brambila assembled the musicians at A&M’s studio in Los Angeles to record the album. In March 1977, the United Farm Workers Union was presented with 5,000 copies of the album. "I could utilize the talents of many local artists I’d worked with in my earlier years as a record producer and the union could sell [the album] at rallies, marches, and huelgas", Brambila recalled.

Reissues

The album has been reissued on CD in 1994 and 2005 by Brown Bag Records and digitally in 2014 by Fantasy.

Track listing

Personnel
Credits adapted from the album's liner notes.
Vocalists
 Alfonso Tafoya – spoken word introduction (1)
 Children from the School of Santa Isabel, East Los Angeles – vocals (1)
 Carmen Moreno – vocals (2, 7, 9, 10)
 Steve Salas – vocals (2, 10), background vocals 
 Ramon "Tiguere" Rodriguez – vocals (3)
 Raul Brambila – vocals (4)
 Geri Gonzáles Logan – vocals (5, 10)
 Diana Cruz – vocals (8)
 Rudy Salas – vocals (10), background vocals 
Los Lobos Del Este De Los Angeles
 David Hidalgo – guitar, requinto jarocho, mandola, violin, background vocals, arrangements 
 Cesar Rosas – guitar, mandolin, background vocals, vocals (6), arrangements  
 Louie Pérez – charango, vihuela, guitar, requinto romantico, palitos, arrangements    
 Conrad R. Lozano – guitarron, upright bass, background vocals, vocals (10), arrangements  
 Frank Gonzáles – harp, mandolin, guitar, harmonica, background vocals, arrangements 
Additional musicians
 Mark Fogelquist – violin
 Rudy "Bub" Villa – flute 
 Arturo Gertz – harp
Production 
 Art P. Brambila – producer, cover concept, design
 Steve Katz – engineer 
 Ellis Sorkin – engineer    
 Ed Thacker – engineer 
 Carol Lee Dewey – photography   
 Allan M. Galvan – photography
 Rod Dyer – graphics
 Cesar E. Chavez – liner notes
 Philip Sonnichsen – musical consultant

References

External links
 Tierra

Charity albums
Tejano music albums
Los Lobos albums
1977 albums